Jillian Leigh Bell (born April 25, 1984) is an American actress, comedian and screenwriter. She stars in the 2019 film Brittany Runs a Marathon and 2022's I'm Totally Fine. She starred as Jillian Belk on Workaholics, voiced the role of Violet Hart in Bless the Harts and had a recurring role as Dixie on the final season of Eastbound & Down, and appeared in 22 Jump Street, Fist Fight, and Godmothered.

Early life
Bell was born and raised in Las Vegas, the daughter of Tanzy and Ron Bell. Bell began to study improv at the age of eight. She graduated from Bishop Gorman High School in 2002. After high school, she moved to Los Angeles, and became a member of the Groundlings.

Career
Bell is an alumna of The Straitjacket Society in Los Angeles. She auditioned for Saturday Night Live. Although she did not join the cast, she became a writer for the show in 2009 for its 35th season. The same year Bell appeared in an episode of Curb Your Enthusiasm as an assistant who wears revealing clothing at work.

In 2011, she began to play Jillian Belk on the Comedy Central series Workaholics. Film director Paul Thomas Anderson noticed her in Workaholics and cast her in a small role in his 2012 film, The Master and yet again in another small role in his 2014 film, Inherent Vice. She had a recurring role as Dixie in the fourth and final season of Eastbound and Down. In 2014, she appeared in 22 Jump Street alongside Jonah Hill and Channing Tatum. In 2015, she co-starred in Goosebumps and The Night Before.

In January 2016, Comedy Central debuted a new series, Idiotsitter, in which Bell portrays the constantly misbehaving adult daughter of wealthy parents. Idiotsitter was launched as a web series in early 2014, before being picked up in June 2014 by Comedy Central for network airing.

Bell starred as the Fairy Godmother in Disney's Godmothered, which was released on Disney+.

Filmography

Film

Television

Accolades 
In 2010, Bell was nominated for a Primetime Emmy Award for Outstanding Writing for a Variety Series for her work in the writers' room on Saturday Night Live.

In 2015, she was nominated for two MTV Movie Awards for Best Fight with Jonah Hill and Best Villain for her work on 22 Jump Street.

In 2019, she received the Fairbanks Award at the San Diego International Film Festival and the Next Wave Award at the Provincetown International Film Festival.

References

External links

JIllian Bell on Instagram
Jillian Bell on Twitter

1984 births
Living people
21st-century American actresses
21st-century American comedians
Actresses from Nevada
American film actresses
American people of Romanian descent
American television actresses
American television writers
American voice actresses
American women comedians
Bishop Gorman High School alumni
Comedians from Nevada
People from the Las Vegas Valley
Screenwriters from Nevada
American women television writers
21st-century American screenwriters